Michael Olunga Ogada (born 26 March 1994) is a Kenyan professional footballer who plays as a striker for Qatari club Al-Duhail and captains the Kenya national team.

Club career

Early career and Gor Mahia
While still a student at the Upper Hill School, Olunga began his career with the Liberty Sports Academy in the Nairobi County League. He scored 32 goals for the side during the 2012 season, helping them finish the season unbeaten and earn promotion to the Nairobi Provincial League. He made headlines when he scored seven goals in a single match helping his team to an 8–0 win.

Initially reported to be attending trials in France, Olunga signed for Kenyan Premier League side Tusker on a one-year loan deal from Liberty on 19 December 2012.

After finishing the 2013 season with two goals for Tusker, Olunga was loaned to fellow Premier League side Thika United for another year, before joining Gor Mahia before the beginning of the 2015 season. He finished the season as the club's top scorer in the league with 19 goals to help the side win a record 15th league title without losing a single match, including the second goal in a 2–0 win over Muhoroni Youth on their final league match of the season.

Djurgården
On 17 February 2016, Olunga joined Swedish side Djurgårdens IF on a four-year contract, after joining the team's pre-season training camp on trial. He scored his first two goals for Djurgården on 8 August 2016 against IFK Göteborg in a 3–1 win. He was also named man of the match and Djurgården coach Mark Dempsey praised him for his match winning heroics. In the next match Olunga scored once again in the 2–2 draw versus IF Elfsborg at the Tele2 Arena. On 27 August, he scored the match-winning goal against Gefle IF with a volley in the 86th minute. In the last 12 games of the Allsvenskan Olunga scored 12 goals which earned him a fifth place in the Allsvenskan top scorer table. He was nominated for Newcomer of the year in Swedish football by a jury of Allsvenskan coaches and Swedish journalists as well as the coaches of the Swedish national teams. The award later went to Alexander Isak.

On 10 November 2016, Kenyan football site Soka reported that Djurgården had turned down offers on Olunga from La Liga side Betis, Lokeren, Belgian champions Club Brugge and Swedish champions Malmö FF.

Guizhou Zhicheng
In 2017, Olunga joined Chinese club Guizhou Zhicheng.

Girona (loan)
On 1 September 2017, Olunga was loaned to La Liga side Girona FC, for one year. On 13 January 2018, he made his La Liga debut against Las Palmas scoring a hat-trick in the span of 22 minutes during a 6–0 win, becoming both the first Kenyan player and the first Girona player to score a hat-trick in La Liga.

Kashiwa Reysol
On 10 August 2018, Olunga joined Japanese club Kashiwa Reysol.

On 24 November 2019, he scored eight goals for Kashiwa in a 13–1 victory over Kyoto Sanga. Olunga finished the season with 27 league goals as Kashiwa finished the J2 season as champions and won promotion to the first division.

In J1 League play on 26 July 2020, Olunga scored a hat-trick against Vegalta Sendai; the match finished in a 5–1 victory.

Olunga finished as the top scorer in the 2020 Japanese J1 League with 28 goals, winning the Golden boot and the J-League 2020 MVP. He is the first African player to win the J-league MVP award.

Al-Duhail
In January 2021, Olunga moved to Qatar Stars League champions Al-Duhail on a three-seasons contract, for a reported transfer fee of €6 million.

He made his debut for the club on 12 January, in a 3–1 away loss against Al Sadd. On 25 January 2021, Olunga scored a hat-trick in Duhail's 6–0 win against Al Ahli in the Emir of Qatar Cup . Olunga finished as the top scorer of the 2021 AFC Champions League, but Al-Duhail crashed out of the competition after a 1–1 draw with team Al Ahli Saudi in late April.and Esteghlal qualified as group winners.

International career
Olunga made his debut for the Kenya national team in a friendly against Seychelles at the Stade Linité in Victoria on 28 March 2015. He scored his first goal for the Harambee Stars in a friendly against South Sudan which resulted in a 2–0 win. On 27 July 2019, during the 2019 AFCON Olunga scored a double to complete a comeback against Tanzania.

Personal life
Olunga studied geospatial engineering at the Technical University of Kenya and pursued a Bachelor of Engineering degree. For this reason, he is regularly known as "The Engineer" by Kenyan football fans. He has stated that he looks up to Dutch striker Robin van Persie as a role model.

Career statistics

Club

International
Scores and results list Kenya's goal tally first, score column indicates score after each Olunga goal.

Honours
Tusker
Kenyan Super Cup: 2013
KPL Top 8 Cup: 2013

Gor Mahia
Kenyan Premier League: 2014, 2015
Kenyan Super Cup: 2015
KPL Top 8 Cup: 2015

Kashiwa Reysol
J2 League: 2019

Al-Duhail
Emir Cup: 2022

Individual
 KPL Player of the Year: 2015
 J.League Top Scorer: 2020
 J.League MVP Award: 2020
 J.League Best XI: 2020
 Kenyan Outstanding Sports Personality of Year: 2021
 AFC Champions League Top Scorer: 2021
 Qatar Stars League Top Scorer: 2021–22

References

External links
 
 
 
 Michael Olunga at Djurgårdens IF's official website 
 
 Michael Olunga at soka.co.ke

1994 births
Living people
Footballers from Nairobi
Kenyan footballers
Association football forwards
Tusker F.C. players
Thika United F.C. players
Gor Mahia F.C. players
Djurgårdens IF Fotboll players
Guizhou F.C. players
Girona FC players
Kashiwa Reysol players
Al-Duhail SC players
Kenyan Premier League players
Allsvenskan players
Chinese Super League players
La Liga players
J1 League players
J2 League players
J1 League Player of the Year winners
Qatar Stars League players
Kenya international footballers
2019 Africa Cup of Nations players
Kenyan expatriate footballers
Kenyan expatriate sportspeople in Sweden
Kenyan expatriate sportspeople in China
Kenyan expatriate sportspeople in Spain
Kenyan expatriate sportspeople in Japan
Kenyan expatriate sportspeople in Qatar
Expatriate footballers in Sweden
Expatriate footballers in China
Expatriate footballers in Spain
Expatriate footballers in Japan
Expatriate footballers in Qatar